Mucin and cadherin-like protein is a protein that in humans is encoded by the MUPCDH gene.

This gene is a novel mucin-like gene that is a member of the cadherin superfamily. While encoding nonpolymorphic tandem repeats rich in proline, serine and threonine similar to mucin proteins, the gene also contains sequence encoding calcium-binding motifs found in all cadherins. The role of the hybrid extracellular region and the specific function of this protein have not yet been determined. Alternative splicing has been identified, with observed variation resulting in the presence or absence of domains. In addition, splicing occurs in the 5' UTR but transcripts including these variations have not been described completely.

References

Further reading